Eriksmåla is a locality situated in Emmaboda Municipality, Kalmar County, Sweden with 231 inhabitants in 2010.

References 

Populated places in Kalmar County
Populated places in Emmaboda Municipality
Värend